Cody stylized as CODY is a Danish musical band founded by the Danish roots musician and songwriter Kasper Kaae in 2009. The band  performs alternative country, pop and Nordic folk music. It has released three albums and two EPs to date.

Kaae began writing songs of his own in 2006 and several musicians and friends later joined.  They played the Danish Roskilde Festival three times, G! Festival, Spot Festival, By:Larm, Fusion Festival, Montreux Jazz Festival.

Cody's music was used in the soundtrack of the film 12 Meter Ohne Kopf and Danish films En Familie, Kapringen and Me & You Forever.

Discography

Albums

EPs
2009: Cody
2011: Under the Pillow, Under the elms

Soundtracks
12 Meter Ohne Kopf (German)
En Familie (Danish, by Pernille Fischer Christensen)
Kapringen (Danish, by Tobias Lindholm)
Me & You Forever (Danish by Kaspar Munk)
''Kraftidioten (2014) movie soundtrack

References

External links
Official website
facebook

Danish musical groups
2009 establishments in Denmark
Musical groups established in 2009